B. D. Jatti Ministry was the Council of Ministers in Mysore, a state in South India headed by B. D. Jatti of the Indian National Congress.

The ministry had multiple  ministers including the Chief Minister. All ministers belonged to the Indian National Congress.

B. D. Jatti became Chief minister after S. Nijalingappa resigned as Chief Minister of Mysore on 15 May 1958.

Chief Minister & Cabinet Ministers

Minister of State

See also 
 Mysore Legislative Assembly
 Mysore Legislative Council
 Politics of Mysore

References 

Cabinets established in 1958
1958 establishments in Mysore State
1958 in Indian politics
1962 disestablishments in India
Jatti
Indian National Congress state ministries
Cabinets disestablished in 1962